The Men's Open event at the 2010 South American Games was held on March 21.

Medalists

Results

Main Bracket

Repechage

References
Report

M999
South American Games 2010